Robert James McNichols (April 19, 1922 – December 20, 1992) was a United States district judge of the United States District Court for the Eastern District of Washington.

Education and career
McNichols was born in Bonners Ferry, Idaho. He was in the United States Army during World War II, from 1940 to 1941 and from 1943 to 1946 and became a technician fifth grade. He attended Washington State College in Pullman, Washington and the Gonzaga University School of Law in Spokane, Washington. Following his first year as a law student in 1949, he worked for the Spokane Stock Exchange as a quotation clerk, and received a Bachelor of Laws from Gonzaga in 1952. McNichols was a law clerk to Washington Supreme Court Justice Edward Schaellenback in 1952. He was a deputy prosecuting attorney of Spokane County from 1953 to 1954, and was in private practice in Spokane with the firm of Winston and Cashatt for 24 years, from 1955 to 1979.

Federal judicial service
McNichols was nominated by President Jimmy Carter on November 6, 1979, to the United States District Court for the Eastern District of Washington, to a new seat created earlier that year by 92 Stat. 1629. He was confirmed by the United States Senate on December 5, 1979 and received his commission on December 10, 1979, and was sworn in on January 4, 1980. He was Chief Judge from 1980 to 1989, and assumed senior status on April 20, 1991. He served in that capacity for twenty months, until his death from lung cancer in Spokane on December 20, 1992. He is buried in Idaho at the St. Thomas Cemetery in Coeur d'Alene.

Family
McNichols' older brother Raymond Clyne McNichols (1914–1985) was also a federal judge, in Idaho. During his investiture to the federal bench in January 1980, the elder swore the younger in.

References

External links

1922 births
1993 deaths
Gonzaga University School of Law alumni
Judges of the United States District Court for the Eastern District of Washington
United States district court judges appointed by Jimmy Carter
20th-century American judges
People from Bonners Ferry, Idaho
Military personnel from Idaho
United States Army soldiers
United States Army personnel of World War II